Cottens may refer to:

Cottens, Fribourg, Switzerland
Cottens, Vaud, Switzerland